This page documents the tornadoes and tornado outbreaks of 1947, primarily in the United States. Most recorded tornadoes form in the U.S., although some events may take place internationally. Tornado statistics for older years like this often appear significantly lower than modern years due to fewer reports or confirmed tornadoes.

All documented significant tornadoes prior to 1950 in the United States were given unofficial ratings by tornado experts like Thomas P. Grazulis, which this article uses for the ratings below. Most of these records are limited to significant tornadoes; those rated F2 or higher on the Fujita scale, or which caused a fatality. Some listed events were tornado families rather than single tornadoes. There are also no official tornado counts for each month, so not every month is included in this article. In subsequent years, the documentation of tornadoes became much more widespread and efficient, with the average annual tornado count being around 1,253. Outside the United States, various meteorological organizations, like the European Severe Storms Laboratory rated tornadoes, which are considered official ratings.

Events

United States yearly total

January

January 15
An extremely brief F2 tornado leveled a home just northeast of Pinson in Tennessee, killing the entire family of four. Several barns and a second home were destroyed by the tornado as it tracked .

January 29–30

A tornado outbreak started on the afternoon of January 30, primarily in Arkansas, Missouri, and Tennessee. One person died at Barren Hollow in Fulton County and nineteen others were injured. Several homes were leveled but most of the damage was to farm buildings. An F3 tornado killed five people when it swept away two homes near Montier, Missouri. One other died from an F2 tornado that destroyed small homes in Haywood and Crockett Counties, Tennessee. Five people in one family were injured.
Tornadic activity in the Southeast and Midwest continued past midnight and into the morning of January 30. Two killer F3 tornadoes touched down in Alabama. The first killed three people as it destroyed farms near Kent. The second destroyed the village of Bethel, west of Georgiana, where three more people died. Furniture from one destroyed home had still not been found a week after the tornado.

March

March 12
An F2 tornado struck south of Kaplan to west of Abbeville, Louisiana. The tornado killed two people and damaged 50 homes that "bounced like a rubber ball."

April

April 9–10

One of the deadliest tornado events in United States history, a devastating tornado family developed in the Texas Panhandle, moved across Oklahoma, and into Kansas, killing at least 181 people. The town of Glazier, Texas was completely destroyed, with 17 deaths. Most of Higgins, Texas, where 51 died, was destroyed as well. The worst damage was in Woodward, Oklahoma, where the storm killed at least 107 people. About 1,000 homes were destroyed in Woodward and more than 1,000 people were injured. The track, as a whole, was rated F5. Historically, this tornado family is listed as the sixth deadliest tornado to hit the United States, and is the deadliest tornado in Oklahoma history.

April 28–30

On April 29 at 3:25 PM, an F4 hit Worth, Missouri, killing 14. Later that evening at 8:00 PM, another F4 touched down just west of Avoca, Arkansas, uprooting several trees. The tornado then lifted for two miles before touching back down at Bridgewater, killing four and destroying the town. The tornado continued on to Garfield, killing five. Bridgewater was never rebuilt after the storm. At 9:00 PM, an F3 killed one in Winkler, Missouri.

May

May 31

An F5 tornado hit the small town of Leedey, Oklahoma. The tornado touched down at 7:30 PM, making its way through eastern rural Roger Mills County and unroofing the Three Corner School before crossing into Dewey County and striking Leedey. The tornado kept moving until it dissipated 3 miles east-northeast of Leedey. 7 people were killed and 15 people were injured.

June

June 1
An F4 hit Jefferson County, Arkansas, killing 35, including 16 in Pine Bluff.

July

July 5 (Sweden)

August

August 15 (Soviet Union)

Notes

References 

Torn
Tornado-related lists by year
1947 meteorology